Jorge Machado de Barros (born 26 April 1935) is a Brazilian sprinter. He competed in the men's 100 metres at the 1956 Summer Olympics.

References

External links
 

1935 births
Living people
Athletes (track and field) at the 1956 Summer Olympics
Athletes (track and field) at the 1959 Pan American Games
Brazilian male sprinters
Olympic athletes of Brazil
Place of birth missing (living people)
Pan American Games athletes for Brazil
20th-century Brazilian people